Sigma Oasis is the fifteenth studio album by the American rock band Phish, released on the band's JEMP Records label on April 2, 2020. The album was recorded at their studio The Barn and was produced by the band and Vance Powell.

Production
Sigma Oasis was recorded over the course of one week in November 2019 at The Barn, the band's Vermont recording studio. The album was mixed at Sputnik Sound in Nashville. The album's cover is a photograph of the band members standing on the porch of The Barn, and was taken by photographer Rene Huemer. Most of the album was recorded and tracked live at The Barn, although keyboardist Page McConnell later recorded synthesizer overdubs and guitarist Trey Anastasio recorded backing vocal and percussion overdubs after the sessions but before the final mix process.

All nine songs on the album had been performed by Phish in concert prior to the release of the album. The songs were first performed between 2015 and 2019, with the exception of "Steam", which debuted in 2011. "Mercury" and "Shade" were both recorded for the band's 2016 album Big Boat, but did not make that album's final track listing, with the appearance of the former having been vetoed by producer Bob Ezrin. The title track for Sigma Oasis was debuted by the Trey Anastasio Band in the summer of 2018, and was first performed by Phish in December 2019. Sigma Oasis is the first Phish record since Farmhouse to only feature songwriting contributions from guitarist Trey Anastasio and lyricists Tom Marshall and Scott Herman.

Release
Phish did not plan to release Sigma Oasis in April 2020, but decided to move up the release date due to the COVID-19 pandemic; In a statement, the band wrote "When we recorded the album, we didn't plan to release it this way. But today, because of the environment we're all in, it just feels right. We don't know the next time that we're all going to be able to be together. This is an opportunity to have a moment where the Phish community can share something despite being physically separated."

Sigma Oasis was announced by the band on March 31, 2020 during their "Dinner and a Movie" livestream, a free weekly video broadcast of older Phish concerts the band had been offering during the pandemic. The album was premiered the next day, in a listening party simulcast on the LivePhish website, SiriusXM's Phish Radio station and the band's Facebook page. Sigma Oasis was then released for streaming and purchase at midnight on April 2.

The album received a physical release on vinyl and compact disc on November 27, 2020.

Critical reception

In Pitchfork, critic Sam Sodomsky praised Sigma Oasis for showcasing the band's improvisational jamming, which is a cornerstone of their live performances but rarely appears on their studio records. Sodomsky called the album "a pleasant surprise, a small joy, an unlikely course correction," compared to its predecessor Big Boat.

On Allmusic, critic Stephen Thomas Erlewine wrote that Sigma Oasis sounded "Unified and relaxed, the rare Phish studio set that feels as effortless as a Phish concert."

On PopMatters, Greg Schwartz wrote that Sigma Oasis was a "vibrant and uplifting album for the fanbase in their hour of collective spiritual need", referring to the subsequent cancelation of the band's summer 2020 tour due to the COVID-19 pandemic.

Track listing

Personnel
Phish
 Trey Anastasio – guitars, lead vocals
 Page McConnell – keyboards, backing vocals, co-lead vocals on "Leaves"
 Mike Gordon – bass guitar, backing vocals
 Jon Fishman – drums, backing vocals, marimba on "Mercury"

Additional musicians
 David Davidson – conductor/violin
 David Angell – violin
 Karen Winkelmann – violin
 Kristin Wilkinson – viola
 Conni Ellisor – violin
 Carole Rabinowitz – cello
 Justin Levy – vocals
 Tasha DeNae – vocals
 Jaymee Rodriguez – vocals
 Shaunise Brown – vocals
 Noah Denney – percussion
 Don Hart – string arrangements
 Raab Stevenson – vocal arrangements and production

Production
 Produced by Phish and Vance Powell
 Recorded by Vance Powell, Michael Fahey, Ben Collette, and Jared Slomoff
 Mixed by Vance Powell at Sputnik Sound
 Mix assisted by Michael Fahey
 Mastered by Pete Lyman at Infrasonic Mastering, Nashville TN
 Album Art Design by Julia Mordaunt
 Photography by Rene Huemer

Charts

References

2020 albums
Phish albums
Impact of the COVID-19 pandemic on the music industry
Rock albums by American artists